Meet John Doe is a 1941 American comedy-drama film directed and produced by Frank Capra, written by Robert Riskin, and starring Gary Cooper and Barbara Stanwyck. The film is about a "grassroots" political campaign created unwittingly by a newspaper columnist with the involvement of a hired homeless man and pursued by the paper's wealthy owner. It became a box-office hit and was nominated for an Academy Award for Best Story. It was ranked No. 49 in AFI's 100 Years ... 100 Cheers. In 1969, the film entered the public domain in the United States because the claimants did not renew its copyright registration in the 28th year after publication. It was the first of two features Capra made for Warner Brothers, after he left Columbia Pictures, the other being Arsenic and Old Lace (1944).

Plot
A local newspaper, The Bulletin, is under new management, with columnist Ann Mitchell being one of the staffers dismissed to "streamline" the paper, but not before being told to write one final column. Infuriated, Ann prints a letter from a fictional unemployed "John Doe" threatening suicide on Christmas Eve in protest of society's ills. When the letter causes a sensation among readers, and the paper's competition, The Chronicle, suspects a fraud and starts to investigate, editor Henry Connell is persuaded to rehire Ann, who schemes to boost the newspaper's sales by exploiting the fictional John Doe. From a number of derelicts who show up at the paper claiming to have written the original letter, Ann and Henry hire John Willoughby, a former baseball player and tramp in need of money to repair his injured arm, to play the role of John Doe. Ann starts to pen a series of articles in Doe's name, elaborating on the original letter's ideas of society's disregard for people in need.

Willoughby gets $50, a new suit of clothes, and a plush hotel suite with his tramp friend "The Colonel", who launches into an extended diatribe against "helots", people who are heels trying to sell things, burdening others with ownership, tying them down with responsibilities that require money to pay for them, until they, too, become helots. Proposing to take Doe nationwide via the radio, Ann is given $100 a week by the Bulletin's publisher, D. B. Norton, to write radio speeches for Willoughby. Meanwhile, John is offered a $5,000 bribe from the Chronicle to admit the whole thing was a publicity stunt, but ultimately turns it down and delivers the speech Ann has written for him instead. Afterward, feeling conflicted, he runs away, riding the rails with the Colonel until they reach Millsville. "John Doe" is recognized at a diner and brought to City Hall, where he's met by Bert Hanson, who explains how he was inspired by Doe's words to start a "John Doe club" with his neighbors.

The John Doe philosophy spreads across the country, developing into a broad grassroots movement whose simple slogan is, "Be a better neighbor". However, Norton secretly plans to channel support for Doe into support for his own national political ambitions. When a John Doe rally is scheduled, with John Doe clubs from throughout the country in attendance, Norton instructs Mitchell to write a speech for Willoughby in which he announces the foundation of a new political party and endorses Norton as its presidential candidate. On the night of the rally, John, who has come to believe in the John Doe philosophy himself, learns of Norton's treachery from a drunken Henry. He denounces Norton and tries to expose the plot at the rally, but his speech is interrupted by hordes of newsboys carrying a special edition of the Bulletin exposing Doe as a fake. Norton claims Doe had deceived him and the staff of the newspaper, like everyone else, and cuts off the loudspeakers before Doe could defend himself. Despondent at letting his now-angry followers down, John attempts suicide by jumping from the roof of the City Hall on Christmas Eve, as indicated in the original John Doe letter. Ann, who has fallen in love with John, desperately tries to talk him out of jumping (saying that the first John Doe has already died for the sake of humanity), and Hanson and his neighbors tell him of their plan to restart their John Doe club. Convinced not to kill himself, John leaves, carrying a fainted Ann in his arms, and Henry turns to Norton and says, "There you are, Norton! The people! Try and lick that!"

Cast

 Gary Cooper as John Doe / Long John Willoughby
 Barbara Stanwyck as Ann Mitchell
 Edward Arnold as D.B. Norton
 Walter Brennan as The Colonel
 Spring Byington as Mrs. Mitchell
 James Gleason as Henry Connell
 Gene Lockhart as Mayor Lovett
 Rod La Rocque as Ted Sheldon
 Irving Bacon as "Beanie"
 Regis Toomey as Bert Hansen (credited as just 'Bert')
 J. Farrell MacDonald as "Sourpuss"
 Harry Holman as Mayor Hawkins
 Warren Hymer as "Angelface"
 Andrew Tombes as Spencer
 Pierre Watkin as Hammett
 Stanley Andrews as Western
 Mitchell Lewis as Bennett
 Charles Wilson as Charlie Dawson
 Vaughan Glaser as Governor
 Sterling Holloway as Dan
 Harry Davenport as Former Bulletin Owner (uncredited)
 Garry Owen as Sign Painter (uncredited)

Production

The film was screenwriter Robert Riskin's last collaboration with Capra. The screenplay was derived from a 1939 film treatment, titled "The Life and Death of John Doe", written by Richard Connell and Robert Presnell who would go on to be the recipients of the film's sole Academy Award nomination for Best Original Story. The treatment was based upon Connell's 1922 Century Magazine story titled "A Reputation".

Gary Cooper was always Frank Capra's first choice to play John Doe. Cooper had agreed to the part without reading a script for two reasons: He had enjoyed working with Capra on their earlier collaboration, Mr. Deeds Goes to Town (1936), and he wanted to work with Barbara Stanwyck. The role of the hardbitten news reporter, however, was initially offered to Ann Sheridan,  but the first choice for the role had been turned down by Warner Bros. due to a contract dispute, and Olivia de Havilland was similarly contacted, albeit unsuccessfully.

The composer selected was frequent Capra collaborator Dimitri Tiomkin, who also did the scores for Capra's Lost Horizon, Mr. Smith Goes to Washington and It's a Wonderful Life. He later won two music Oscars for the non-Capra film High Noon.

Reception
Bosley Crowther, the film critic for The New York Times wrote that John Willoughby was just the latest of the everyman that Frank Capra had portrayed in earlier films: 

In the Variety review, there was a more critical look at the plot:

The film is recognized by American Film Institute in these lists:
 2003: AFI's 100 Years ... 100 Heroes & Villains:
 John Willoughby – Nominated Hero
 2006: AFI's 100 Years ... 100 Cheers – #49

Adaptations
Meet John Doe was dramatized as a radio play on the September 28, 1941 broadcast of The Screen Guild Theater, starring Gary Cooper, Barbara Stanwyck and Edward Arnold in their original roles.

A musical stage version of the film, written by Eddie Sugarman and composed by Andrew Gerle, was produced by Ford's Theatre in Washington, DC, from March 16 to May 20, 2007, featuring Heidi Blickenstaff as Ann Mitchell and James Moye as John Willoughby/John Doe. Donna Lynne Champlin had previously appeared as Ann Mitchell in workshop versions of the show. After an off-Broadway stint, the Chicago production of the musical was presented at the Porchlight Music Theatre from March 5 to April 17, 2011, under the direction of Jim Beaudry, musical direction by Eugene Dizon, featuring Elizabeth Lanza as Ann Mitchell and Karl Hamilton as John Willoughby/John Doe, garnering a Jeff Award nomination for Actress in a Principal Role – Musical for Elizabeth Lanza. Due to this production, R&H Theatricals has licensed the show for future productions.

A Bollywood remake, Main Azaad Hoon, was released in 1989, starring Amitabh Bachchan.

Restoration and home media
In 1945 Capra and Riskin sold all rights in Meet John Doe to Sherman S. Krellberg's Goodwill Pictures, a New York distributor. While in Goodwill's possession, the original camera negative deteriorated due to poor storage and was eventually destroyed. Copyright in the film was not renewed and it fell into the public domain in 1969.

The Library of Congress created a fresh preservation negative in the 1970s by combining Goodwill's surviving 35mm prints with the Warner Bros. studio print.

Poor quality copies of Meet John Doe have proliferated on home video for years, sourced from inferior quality prints, while the restored LoC print remains in storage. In 2001 Ken Barnes' Laureate Presentations undertook a digital restoration of the best available European print. This was released on DVD by Sanctuary in the UK and by VCI in the US. To date these are the best quality commercially available releases.

See also
 List of Christmas films

References

Notes

Bibliography

 Capra, Frank. Frank Capra, The Name Above the Title: An Autobiography. New York: The Macmillan Company, 1971. .
 McBride, Joseph. Frank Capra: The Catastrophe of Success. New York: Touchstone Books, 1992. .
 Scherle, Victor and William Levy. The Films of Frank Capra. Secaucus, New Jersey: The Citadel Press, 1977. .

External links

 
 Meet John Doe, complete film on YouTube
 
 
 
 
 
 Six Screen Plays by Robert Riskin (1997), edited and introduced by Pat McGilligan - UC Press E-Books Collection
 Screenplay at Dailyscript.com
Cinema Then, Cinema Now: Meet John Doe a 1986 discussion of the film hosted by Jerry Carlson of CUNY TV

1941 films
1940s Christmas comedy-drama films
1940s romantic comedy-drama films
American black-and-white films
American Christmas comedy-drama films
American romantic comedy-drama films
1940s English-language films
Films about elections
Films about journalists
Films directed by Frank Capra
Films scored by Dimitri Tiomkin
Films with screenplays by Robert Riskin
Warner Bros. films
Articles containing video clips
Films about suicide
1940s American films